The Deepings are a series of settlements close to the River Welland near the borders of southern Lincolnshire and north western Cambridgeshire in eastern England.
Peterborough is about 8 miles to the south, Spalding about 10 miles to the north east and Stamford about 8 miles to the west.

The area is very low-lying, and gave The Deepings their name (a Saxon name translatable as either 'deep places' or 'deep lands').  The villages are mentioned in the Domesday Book.  Deeping Fen lies to the North, and the drainage of it was an important part of seventeenth and eighteenth century land reclamation.  It is now the responsibility of the Welland and Deepings Internal Drainage Board.

The Settlements

Lincolnshire 

Within the South Kesteven District Council Area:
 Market Deeping — a market town and the largest of the Deepings settlements
 Deeping St James — a village and the second largest Deepings settlement. The civil parish of Deeping St James includes the villages of:
 Frognall
 Stowgate
 West Deeping
 Tongue End

Within the South Holland District Council Area:
 Deeping St Nicholas
 Hop Pole — a hamlet within the Deeping St Nicholas civil parish

Cambridgeshire 

 Deeping Gate — a village within the Peterborough City Council

History

Drainage of the area dates back at least as far as the Romans, and the Car Dyke, but the capital involved always required a strong state, and rich men, to improve the land.

See also
Deeping St James Priory
Saint Guthlac's church, Market Deeping

References

Further reading
History of the Deepings (or Three Deepings in a Row) by Florence A. Day (n.d.)
The Medieval Fenland by H. C. Darby (first published by The Cambridge University Press, 1940, reprinted by David & Charles, 1974)

 
Villages in Lincolnshire
Geography of Peterborough